Georgi Varoshkin (20 December 1932 – 20 September 2017) was a Bulgarian alpine skier. He competed at the 1956 Winter Olympics and the 1960 Winter Olympics. He was an associate professor at the National Sports Academy "Vasil Levski".

References

External links
 

1932 births
2017 deaths
Bulgarian male alpine skiers
Olympic alpine skiers of Bulgaria
Alpine skiers at the 1956 Winter Olympics
Alpine skiers at the 1960 Winter Olympics
Place of birth missing